In the history of United States foreign policy, the Roosevelt Corollary was an addition to the Monroe Doctrine articulated by President Theodore Roosevelt in his State of the Union address in 1904 after the Venezuelan crisis of 1902–1903. The corollary states that the United States could intervene in the internal affairs of Latin American countries if they committed flagrant and chronic wrongdoings.

Roosevelt tied his policy to the Monroe Doctrine, and it was also consistent with his foreign policy included in his Big Stick Diplomacy. Roosevelt stated that in keeping with the Monroe Doctrine, the United States was justified in exercising "international police power" to put an end to chronic unrest or wrongdoing in the Western Hemisphere. President Herbert Hoover in 1930 endorsed the Clark Memorandum that repudiated the Roosevelt Corollary in favor of what was later called the Good Neighbor policy.

Background 

The Roosevelt Corollary was articulated in the aftermath of the Venezuela Crisis of 1902–1903. In late 1902, Britain, Germany, and Italy imposed a naval blockade of several months against Venezuela after President Cipriano Castro refused to pay foreign debts and damages suffered by European people in a recent Venezuelan civil war. The dispute was referred to an international court for arbitration, which concluded on 22 February 1904 that the blockading powers involved in the Venezuela crisis were entitled to preferential treatment in the payment of their claims. This left a number of other countries which did not take military action, including the United States, with no recourse. The U.S. disagreed with the outcome in principle, and feared it would encourage future European intervention to gain such advantage. To preclude European intervention, in December the Roosevelt Corollary asserted a right of the United States to intervene in order to "stabilize" the economic affairs of small states in the Caribbean and Central America if they were unable to pay their international debts.

Content of Corollary 
Roosevelt's annual message on 6 December 1904, to Congress declared:

While the Monroe Doctrine had warned European powers to keep their hands off countries in the Americas, President Roosevelt was now saying that "since the United States would not permit the European powers to lay their hands on, he had an obligation to do so himself."

Use 

Though the Roosevelt Corollary was an addition to the Monroe Doctrine, it could also be seen as a departure. While the Monroe Doctrine said European countries should stay out of Latin America, the Roosevelt Corollary took this further to say the United States had the right to exercise military force in Latin American countries to keep European countries out. Historian Walter LaFeber wrote:

Roosevelt first used the Corollary to act in the Dominican Republic in 1904, which at the time was severely indebted and becoming a failed state. The United States dispatched two warships and demanded the customs house be turned over to U.S. negotiators, who then used a percentage of the proceeds to pay foreign creditors. This model—in which United States advisors worked to stabilize Latin American nations through temporary protectorates, staving off European action—became known as "dollar diplomacy". The Dominican experiment, like most other "dollar diplomacy" arrangements, proved temporary and untenable, and the United States launched a larger military intervention in 1916 that lasted to 1924.

U.S. Presidents also cited the Roosevelt Corollary as justification for U.S. intervention in Cuba (1906–1909), Nicaragua (1909–1910, 1912–1925 and 1926–1933), Haiti (1915–1934), and the Dominican Republic (1916–1924).

Shift to the "Good Neighbor" policy 

In 1928, President Calvin Coolidge issued the Clark Memorandum, often seen as a partial repudiation of the Roosevelt Corollary, which stated that the US did not have the right to intervene when there was a threat by European powers. Herbert Hoover also helped to move the US away from the imperialist tendencies of the Roosevelt Corollary by going on good-will tours, withdrawing troops from Nicaragua and Haiti, and abstaining from intervening in the internal affairs of neighboring countries.

In 1934, President Franklin D. Roosevelt further renounced interventionism and established his "Good Neighbor policy" that led to the annulment of the Platt Amendment by the Treaty of Relations with Cuba in 1934, and the negotiation of compensation for Mexico's nationalization of foreign-owned oil assets in 1938. Indeed, leaving unchallenged the emergence of dictatorships like that of Fulgencio Batista in Cuba, Rafael Leonidas Trujillo in the Dominican Republic, Anastasio Somoza in Nicaragua, and François Duvalier in Haiti were each considered to be "Frankenstein dictators" due to the mishandlings of the American occupations in the countries.

The era of the Good Neighbor policy ended with the start of the Cold War in 1945, as the United States felt there was a greater need to protect the Western Hemisphere from Soviet influence.

In 1954, Secretary of State John Foster Dulles invoked the Monroe Doctrine and the Roosevelt Corollary at the Tenth Pan-American Conference in Caracas, denouncing the intervention of Soviet communism in Guatemala. This was used to justify Operation PBSuccess that deposed the democratically elected president Jacobo Árbenz and installed the military regime of Carlos Castillo Armas, the first in a series of military dictators in the country.

Criticism 
The argument made by Mitchener and Weidenmier in 2006 in support of the Roosevelt Corollary to the Monroe Doctrine has been criticized on the grounds that it "represent[s] the one-sided approach that some scholars bring to the study of imperialistic and hegemonic interventions and also highlight how arguments for the general utility of imperialism are increasingly made and accepted." Christopher Coyne and Stephen Davies argue that a foreign policy modeled on the Roosevelt Corollary leads to negative consequences both in national security terms and in terms of its effect on domestic politics.

Critics, such as linguist Noam Chomsky, have argued that the Roosevelt Corollary was merely a more explicit imperialist threat, building on the Monroe Doctrine, indicating that the US would not only intervene in defense of South America in the face of European imperialism but also use its muscle to obtain concessions and privileges for American corporations. Frenchman Serge Ricard of the University of Paris goes even further and states that the Roosevelt Corollary was not merely an addendum to the earlier Monroe Doctrine through which the US pledged to protect the Americas from European imperialist interventions. Rather, the Roosevelt Corollary was "an entirely new diplomatic tenet that epitomized his 'big stick' approach to foreign policy." In other words, while the Monroe Doctrine sought to bar entry to the European empires, the Roosevelt Corollary arguably indicated the United States' intention to take their place.

See also 

 Big stick ideology
 Bush Doctrine
 Dollar diplomacy
 Drago Doctrine
 History of the United States (1865–1918)
 New Imperialism
 Territorial evolution of the United States

Citations

General bibliography 
 Coyne, C. J., Davies, S. (2007). "Empire: public Goods and Bads." Econ Journal Watch, 4(1), 3–45.
 Glickman, Robert Jay. Norteamérica vis-à-vis Hispanoamérica: ¿opposición o asociación? Toronto: Canadian Academy of the Arts, 2005. .
 Meiertöns, Heiko (2010). The Doctrines of US Security Policy – An Evaluation under International Law, Cambridge University Press, .
 Mitchell, Nancy. The Danger of Dreams: German and American Imperialism in Latin America (1999).
 Mitchener, Kris James, and Marc Weidenmier. "Empire, public goods, and the Roosevelt Corollary", Journal of Economic History (2005) 64#5 pp. 658+
 Rabe, Stephen G. "Theodore Roosevelt, the Panama Canal and the Roosevelt Corollary: Sphere of Influence Diplomacy", ch. 16 in Serge Ricard, ed., A Companion to Theodore Roosevelt (2011) 
 Ricard, Serge. "The Roosevelt Corollary". Presidential Studies 2006 36(1): 17–26.  Fulltext: in Swetswise and Ingenta
 Ricard, Serge. "Theodore Roosevelt: Imperialist or Global Strategist in the New Expansionist Age?" Diplomacy & Statecraft (2008) 19#3 pp. 639–657.
 Sexton, Jay. The Monroe Doctrine: Empire and Nation in Nineteenth-Century America (Macmillan, 2011.)

External links 
 

1904 in international relations
1904 in the United States
Banana Wars
Foreign policy doctrines of the United States
Hegemony
History of United States expansionism
Presidency of Theodore Roosevelt
Monroe Doctrine